Subodh College (or S. S. Jain Subodh P. G. College) is one of the oldest colleges in Jaipur, Rajasthan which was established in 1954 managed under Shri Shwetamber Sthanakwasi Jain Society providing undergraduate courses, postgraduate courses, and professional courses.

About
S.S. Jain Subodh PG (Autonomous) College, Jaipur was established under the auspices of S.S. Jain Subodh Shiksha Samiti in 1954 with an aim to provide value based higher education and contribute towards holistic development of the society. The Shiksha Samiti itself was established in 1918.

Location
It is located at Ram Bagh Circle, Jaipur, Rajasthan, India – 302 004.

History
S.S. Jain Subodh PG (Autonomous) College, Jaipur was established under the auspices of S.S. Jain Subodh Shiksha Samiti in 1954.
The Shiksha Samiti itself was established in 1918.

Facilities
College has Five constructed floors with more than 200 classrooms, 46 laboratories,3 research labs, 5 conference / seminar halls, Staff rooms, One open-air theatre, Two botanical gardens, Five smart classrooms, Library and Book Bank, Open playground and indoor stadium, Two well equipped gymnasiums, Huge underground parking for staff and students, one girls' hostel with occupancy of 225 girls.

References
Subodh College

Jain universities and colleges
Universities and colleges in Jaipur
University of Rajasthan
Educational institutions established in 1954
1954 establishments in Rajasthan